District Photo is a digital imaging services company headquartered in Beltsville, Maryland, United States. The company started in 1949 as a black-and-white photograph developing laboratory. It now serves large retail chains that offer photo development services, such as Costco and Walgreens, and has a national mail order film business.

References

External links

Printing companies of the United States
Photography companies of the United States
Beltsville, Maryland
Companies based in Prince George's County, Maryland
Business services companies established in 1949